The 3rd National Congress of the Lao People's Revolutionary Party (LPRP) was held in Vientiane from 27 to 30 April 1982, five years after the 2nd, with nearly 35,000 card-carrying members represented by 228 delegates.

References

Congresses of the Lao People's Revolutionary Party
1982 in Laos
1982 conferences